All Summer Long may refer to:

 All Summer Long (album), a 1964 album by the Beach Boys
 "All Summer Long" (The Beach Boys song), the title song
 "All Summer Long" (Kid Rock song), 2008
 "All Summer Long" (John Cale song), 2013
 All Summer Long (play), a 1954 Broadway play whose original cast featured Carroll Baker
 "All Summer Long", a song by Chris Rea from the album Shamrock Diaries, 1985